Abisara savitri, the Malay tailed Judy, is a small butterfly found in Asia that belongs to the Punches and Judies, that is, the family Riodinidae.

Subspecies
A. s. savitri (India)
A. s. atlas de Nicéville, 1895 (western Java)
A. s. attenuata Tytler, 1915 (Manipur)
A. s. deniya Fruhstorfer, 1914 (Bangka)
A. s. periya Fruhstorfer, 1914 (Natuna)
A. s. sciurus (Fruhstorfer, 1904) (south-eastern Borneo)
A. s. strix (Fruhstorfer, 1904) (northern Borneo)
A. s. susa Hewitson, 1861 (Sumatra)

Gallery

See also
Riodinidae
List of butterflies of India (Riodinidae)

References

 
 

Abisara
Fauna of Pakistan
Butterflies of Asia
Butterflies described in 1843
Butterflies of Singapore